"Stay the Night" is a song by British record producer and DJ Sigala and singer Talia Mar, released as a single on 20 May 2022 by Ministry of Sound and B1 Recordings from Sigala's upcoming second studio album Every Cloud.

It reached number 11 in the UK, where it was also certified gold in January 2023.

Charts

Certifications

Release history

References

2022 singles
2022 songs
Sigala songs
Songs written by Sigala